Dennis C. Golden is a former American football coach for Framingham State University and a college president for Fontbonne University. He played college football at the College of the Holy Cross.

Early years
Golden was born in Bayside, Queens. He attended Holy Cross High School and graduated in its inaugural class. He practiced football and basketball.

Football playing career
Golden was a two–way starter at tackle for the Holy Cross Crusaders football team, where he was a team co–captain in 1962 under head coach Eddie Anderson.

Golden was drafted by the Dallas Cowboys in the 16th round (216th overall) of the 1963 NFL Draft, but he instead chose to enlist in the United States Marines and pursue a career in education. He was a part of the Quantico 1963 Armed Forces Championship football team.

In 1966, he signed a contract with the Boston Patriots of the American Football League, but was waived on August 30.

In 1974, he was inducted into the Holy Cross Varsity Club Hall of Fame. In 2014, he received the Holy Cross Receives Sanctae Crucis Award.

Football coaching career
Golden was the head football coach at Framingham State University, a position he held from 1972 to 1981, finishing with record of 47 wins and 36 losses.

Educational leadership
He was a dean of students and a vice president for student affairs at three different universities (Framingham State, Duquesne and Louisville). He also served as president of the National Association of Student Personnel Administrators and chairman of the board of the Association of Catholic Colleges and Universities.

From 1995 to 2014, Golden was the president of Fontbonne University in Clayton, Missouri. During his tenure, Golden oversaw $32 million in capital improvements on the school's campus.

Head coaching record

Club

Varsity

References

External links
 Holy Cross Hall of Fame profile
 Retirement Lifestyle: Dennis Golden

Year of birth missing (living people)
Living people
American football tackles
Heads of universities and colleges in the United States
Framingham State Rams football coaches
Holy Cross Crusaders football players
Assumption University (Worcester) alumni
Lynch School of Education and Human Development alumni
Holy Cross High School (Flushing) alumni
People from Bayside, Queens
Sportspeople from Queens, New York
Players of American football from New York City
Coaches of American football from New York (state)